Francis Tournefier (born February 28, 1964) is a French weightlifter.

He competed in the 100 kg class (at a bodyweight of 99.15 kg) at the 1988 Summer Olympics in Seoul, ranking fifth with a total of 385 kg.

At the 1990 European Championships he won bronze in the 100 kg category.
He also won bronze in the 100 kg category at the 1991 World Championships.

At the 1992 Summer Olympics he ranked fourth in the 100 kg category, with a total of 387.5 kg.

Personal best performances 
 Snatch: 175.0 kg
 Clean and jerk: 220.0 kg

Squats
Francis was also known for his great squatting ability:

Francis has done 2 x 285.0 kg back squat and 1 x 295.0 kg back squat at 99 kg bodyweight (Showed in an ironmind video)

His personal bests are below:

 Front Squat: 270 kg
 Back Squat: 330 kg

Notes and references

External links 
 

Living people
1964 births
French male weightlifters
Olympic weightlifters of France
Weightlifters at the 1988 Summer Olympics
Weightlifters at the 1992 Summer Olympics
European Weightlifting Championships medalists
World Weightlifting Championships medalists
20th-century French people